United States Air Force Captain Paul F. Lorence (February 17, 1955 – April 15, 1986), a weapon systems officer (WSO), was killed when his F-111F fighter-bomber, tail number 389 and callsign Karma 52,  was shot down in action off the coast of Libya, on April 15, 1986.

Biography
Captain Lorence was a 1980 graduate of San Francisco State University, and was commissioned through Air Force ROTC. He completed USAF Undergraduate Navigator Training (UNT) and was assigned to the 48th Tactical Fighter Wing as an F-111 weapon systems officer (WSO).

On April 14, 1986, the United States launched Operation El Dorado, an Air Force bombing raid into Libya in response to terrorist attacks. During the raid, Capt. Lorence and his pilot, Capt. Fernando Ribas-Dominicci, were shot down off the coast of Libya becoming the only casualties of the entire operation. Capt. Ribas-Dominicci's body was eventually returned by the Libyan government in 1989, however the location of Capt. Lorence's remains is still currently unknown.

Background

On April 14, 1986, in response to acts of terrorism then believed, and now confirmed, to have been sponsored by Libyan leader Colonel Gaddafi – in particular, the 1986 Berlin discotheque bombing of April 6 – and against the backdrop of heightened tension and clashes between the Libyan and U.S. navies over the disputed Gulf of Sidra, the United States launched a surprise attack on targets in Tripoli and other parts of Libya. Neither France nor Spain would agree to U.S. military aircraft overflying of their territory, so the 18 USAF F-111F fighter-bombers which took off from American airbases in Britain had to make a  detour by following the Atlantic coast before cutting into the Mediterranean via the Straits of Gibraltar  and Portugal to carry out their attack on Libya. An additional six F-111F aircraft had launched from RAF Lakenheath as airborne spares in the event of any type of malfunction.  At a certain point in the flight, these six aircraft turned back to home station.  In addition, the 18 F-111Fs were escorted by EF-111A Raven Radar Jamming aircraft which had launched from RAF Upper Heyford, United Kingdom.  Numerous airborne KC-135 and KC-10 tanker aircraft were also part of the world's longest fighter mission along with other support aircraft.  This package of aircraft which had departed the United Kingdom bound for Tripoli, Libya, was part of an overall coordinated strike mission with US Navy aircraft going after targets in Benghazi, Libya, on the same evening.

Captain Lorence and his pilot (Maj. Fernando L. Ribas-Dominicci) were the only U.S. casualties in the bombing raid.

Recovering the bodies
On December 25, 1988, Gaddafi offered to release the body of Capt. Lorence to his family through Pope John Paul II. But the body that was eventually handed over was identified by dental records as that of Capt. Ribas-Dominicci. According to the U.S government, Libya denies holding Lorence's remains.

Family members have led an ongoing campaign to recover Lorence's body. In 1996, Lorence's childhood friend Theodore D. Karantsalis, a public records librarian, started another campaign to retrieve the body by April 15, 2006, the 20th anniversary of his death. On November 17, 2006, the federal government declassified and released details of Operation El Dorado Canyon to Karantsalis pursuant to a lawsuit styled Karantsalis v. Department of Defense filed in Miami, Florida.

Memorial
The names of Lorence and Ribas-Dominicci are engraved in the F-111 "Vark" Memorial Park located in Clovis, New Mexico. Both Lorence and Ribas-Dominicci were awarded the Purple Heart and Ribas-Dominicci was posthumously promoted to the rank of Major, effective April 15, 1986.

The San Francisco State University (SFSU) Department of History established the Paul Lorence Scholarship, honoring Lorence.  Lorence graduated in 1980 from SFSU summa cum laude with a Bachelor of Arts degree in History.

Notes

External links

Further reading

1955 births
1986 deaths
Aviators killed by being shot down
Recipients of the Air Medal
Military personnel missing in action
American military personnel killed in action
United States Air Force officers